"Violent Men" is the debut single by Marion, released in June 1994 on Rough Trade Records.

Track listing
All tracks by Harding/Grantham/Cunningham, lyrics by Harding.

7" vinyl
 "Violent Men"
 "Toys for Boys"

CD
 "Violent Men"
 "Toys for Boys"
 "Today and Tonight"

Personnel
 Jaime Harding - vocals, harmonica
 Tony Grantham - guitar
 Phil Cunningham - guitar
 Julian Phillips - bass
 Murad Mousa - drums

Trivia
 "Toys for Boys" features a brief vocal sample at the end of "Deep Night" by Rudy Vallee, as found in the film My Own Private Idaho.
 "Today and Tonight" was renamed and rerecorded as "All for Love" on their debut album, This World and Body.

1994 debut singles
Marion (band) songs
1994 songs
Rough Trade Records singles
Songs written by Phil Cunningham (rock musician)
Songs written by Jaime Harding